John Branch Jr. (November 4, 1782January 4, 1863) was an American politician who served as U.S. Senator, Secretary of the Navy, the 19th Governor of the state of North Carolina, and was the sixth and last territorial governor of Florida.

Biography
Branch was born in Halifax County, North Carolina, on November 4, 1782, the son of wealthy landowners. Educated at the University of North Carolina, where he was a member of the Philanthropic Society, he occupied himself as a planter and civic leader. Branch served in the North Carolina Senate from 1811 to 1817 and was the state's Governor from 1817 to 1820. After further service in the state Senate, he represented North Carolina in the United States Senate from 1823 until 1829 and was a strong supporter of Andrew Jackson.

When Jackson became President, he selected Branch as his Secretary of the Navy. In that post, Branch promoted several reforms in the Navy's policies and administration, many of which were not implemented until years later. He reduced the resources going to the construction of new ships, while increasing those applied to keeping existing vessels in good repair. Branch also sent the frigate USS Potomac to the Far East to punish the murderers of a U.S. merchant ship's crew and to generally promote and protect American commerce in the region.

John Branch resigned as Secretary in 1831, during the Petticoat affair, which involved the social ostracism of Margaret O'Neill Eaton, the wife of Secretary of War John H. Eaton by a group of Cabinet members and their wives led by Floride Calhoun, the wife of Vice President John C. Calhoun. Later that year, Branch was elected to the U.S. House of Representatives as a Jacksonian and later to North Carolina state political offices. In the mid-1830s, he moved to Leon County, Florida, where he lived for much of the next decade-and-a-half on his Live Oak Plantation. In 1844, President John Tyler appointed him Florida's territorial governor until the 1845 election of a governor under the state constitution. Branch returned to North Carolina in the early 1850s, remaining there until his death on January 4, 1863.

Branch is buried in Elmwood Cemetery in Enfield, North Carolina.

Branch married Eliza Fort (1787-1851) and had 7 children.

Branch was an uncle of the Confederate General Lawrence O'Bryan Branch. His daughter, Margaret, married Daniel Smith Donelson, the nephew of President Jackson.

Bibliography
American National Biography
Dictionary of American Biography
Haywood, Marshall Delancey. John Branch: 1782-1863. Raleigh, NC: Commercial Printing Co., 1915
Hoffmann, William S. John Branch and the Origins of the Whig Party in North Carolina. North Carolina Historical Review 35 (July 1958): 299-315

See also
Branch County, Michigan - A county in Michigan that was named after him

Sources

Biographical Directory of the United States Congress

References

External links

|-

|-

|-

|-

|-

1782 births
1863 deaths
People from Halifax, North Carolina
American people of English descent
United States Secretaries of the Navy
Jackson administration cabinet members
Democratic-Republican Party United States senators from North Carolina
Jacksonian United States senators from North Carolina
Jacksonian members of the United States House of Representatives from North Carolina
North Carolina Democratic-Republicans
Democratic Party governors of North Carolina
Democratic-Republican Party state governors of the United States
Governors of Florida Territory
Democratic Party North Carolina state senators
American planters